Roberto Gallina (born 4 January 1940 in La Spezia) is a former Italian Grand Prix motorcycle road racer and racing team owner. His best year was in 1973 when he finished eighth in the 250cc world championship. After his racing career ended, he started his own racing team which proved to be a successful venture. He won two 500cc world championships as a team owner in 1981 and 1982 with riders Marco Lucchinelli and Franco Uncini.

References 

1940 births
People from La Spezia
Living people
Italian motorcycle racers
250cc World Championship riders
350cc World Championship riders
500cc World Championship riders
Motorcycle racing team owners
Sportspeople from the Province of La Spezia